John Postgate may refer to:
 John Postgate (food safety campaigner) (1820–1881), English surgeon and academic
 John Percival Postgate (1853–1926), English classicist, son of the last
 John Postgate (microbiologist) (1922–2014), English microbiologist and writer, grandson of the last

See also 
 Postgate family